In hyperbolic geometry, the order-5 dodecahedral honeycomb is one of four compact regular space-filling tessellations (or honeycombs) in hyperbolic 3-space. With Schläfli symbol  it has five dodecahedral cells around each edge, and each vertex is surrounded by twenty dodecahedra. Its vertex figure is an icosahedron.

Description
The dihedral angle of a Euclidean regular dodecahedron is ~116.6°, so no more than three of them can fit around an edge in Euclidean 3-space.  In hyperbolic space, however, the dihedral angle is smaller than it is in Euclidean space, and depends on the size of the figure; the smallest possible dihedral angle is 60°, for an ideal hyperbolic regular dodecahedron with infinitely long edges. The dodecahedra in this dodecahedral honeycomb are sized so that all of their dihedral angles are exactly 72°.

Images

Related polytopes and honeycombs 
There are four regular compact honeycombs in 3D hyperbolic space:

There is another honeycomb in hyperbolic 3-space called the order-4 dodecahedral honeycomb, {5,3,4}, which has only four dodecahedra per edge.  These honeycombs are also related to the 120-cell which can be considered as a honeycomb in positively curved space (the surface of a 4-dimensional sphere), with three dodecahedra on each edge, {5,3,3}. Lastly the dodecahedral ditope, {5,3,2} exists on a 3-sphere, with 2 hemispherical cells.

There are nine uniform honeycombs in the [5,3,5] Coxeter group family, including this regular form. Also the bitruncated form, t1,2{5,3,5}, of this honeycomb has all truncated icosahedron cells.

The Seifert–Weber space is a compact manifold that can be formed as a quotient space of the order-5 dodecahedral honeycomb.

This honeycomb is a part of a sequence of polychora and honeycombs with icosahedron vertex figures:

This honeycomb is a part of a sequence of regular polytopes and honeycombs with dodecahedral cells:

Rectified order-5 dodecahedral honeycomb 

The rectified order-5 dodecahedral honeycomb, has alternating icosahedron and icosidodecahedron cells, with a pentagonal prism vertex figure.

Related tilings and honeycomb

There are four rectified compact regular honeycombs:

Truncated order-5 dodecahedral honeycomb 

The truncated order-5 dodecahedral honeycomb, has icosahedron and truncated dodecahedron cells, with a pentagonal pyramid vertex figure.

Related honeycombs

Bitruncated order-5 dodecahedral honeycomb 

The bitruncated order-5 dodecahedral honeycomb, has truncated icosahedron cells, with a tetragonal disphenoid vertex figure.

Related honeycombs

Cantellated order-5 dodecahedral honeycomb 

The cantellated order-5 dodecahedral honeycomb, has rhombicosidodecahedron, icosidodecahedron, and pentagonal prism cells, with a wedge vertex figure.

Related honeycombs

Cantitruncated order-5 dodecahedral honeycomb 

The cantitruncated order-5 dodecahedral honeycomb, has truncated icosidodecahedron, truncated icosahedron, and pentagonal prism cells, with a mirrored sphenoid vertex figure.

Related honeycombs

Runcinated order-5 dodecahedral honeycomb 

The runcinated order-5 dodecahedral honeycomb, has dodecahedron and pentagonal prism cells, with a triangular antiprism vertex figure.

Related honeycombs

Runcitruncated order-5 dodecahedral honeycomb 

The runcitruncated order-5 dodecahedral honeycomb, has truncated dodecahedron, rhombicosidodecahedron, pentagonal prism, and decagonal prism cells, with an isosceles-trapezoidal pyramid vertex figure.

The runcicantellated order-5 dodecahedral honeycomb is equivalent to the runcitruncated order-5 dodecahedral honeycomb.

Related honeycombs

Omnitruncated order-5 dodecahedral honeycomb 

The omnitruncated order-5 dodecahedral honeycomb, has truncated icosidodecahedron and decagonal prism cells, with a phyllic disphenoid vertex figure.

Related honeycombs

See also 
 Convex uniform honeycombs in hyperbolic space
 Regular tessellations of hyperbolic 3-space
 57-cell - An abstract regular polychoron which shared the {5,3,5} symbol.

References 
Coxeter, Regular Polytopes, 3rd. ed., Dover Publications, 1973. . (Tables I and II: Regular polytopes and honeycombs, pp. 294-296)
Coxeter, The Beauty of Geometry: Twelve Essays, Dover Publications, 1999  (Chapter 10: Regular honeycombs in hyperbolic space, Summary tables II,III,IV,V, p212-213)
 Norman Johnson Uniform Polytopes, Manuscript
 N.W. Johnson: The Theory of Uniform Polytopes and Honeycombs, Ph.D. Dissertation, University of Toronto, 1966 
 N.W. Johnson: Geometries and Transformations, (2018) Chapter 13: Hyperbolic Coxeter groups

Honeycombs (geometry)
Self-dual tilings